Jenner Bourne Maude Armour (15 November 1932 – 25 July 2001) was a politician and barrister from Dominica who served as the interim (acting) President of Dominica from 1979 to 1980.

Biography 
He earned a Master of Laws degree in 1959 at the University of London and began practice in 1960. He was a barrister for over 40 years and worked in other countries such as Saint Kitts and Nevis, Trinidad and Tobago, Anguilla. Following a constitutional crisis and the departure of president Fred Degazon, he became an interim head of state. After Degazon's formal resignation in February 1980, he turned his function over to newly elected Aurelius Marie. He then served as a minister in the government of Eugenia Charles. In 1985 he became deputy speaker of parliament. He served as a member of Parliament and Dominica's Attorney General between 1990 and 1995. Jenner B. M. Armour died on 25 July 2001 at the age of 68.

References

1932 births
2001 deaths
Alumni of the University of London
Attorneys-General of Dominica
Dominica jurists
Government ministers of Dominica
Members of the House of Assembly of Dominica
Presidents of Dominica